39th Street/UC Davis Health (originally 39th Street) is a side platformed Sacramento RT light rail station in the Elmhurst neighborhood of Sacramento, California, United States.  Operated by the Sacramento Regional Transit District, the station was opened on July 14, 1994, and is served by the Gold Line. The station is located near the intersection of 39th Street and Highway 50.

Included originally as part of the network, both this and the 48th Street station were deferred and not constructed  in 1987 due to intense neighborhood opposition. However, both would open as infill stations in July 1994 due to a shift in attitude towards the rail project following its successful opening from the surrounding neighborhoods.

In October 2019, RT and the UC Davis Health Medical Center have reached an agreement to rename the station from 39th Street to 39th Street/UC Davis Health station.

Platforms and tracks

References

Sacramento Regional Transit light rail stations
Railway stations in the United States opened in 1994